Queen Silver-Bell is the first in a series of four children's books by Frances Hodgson Burnett with illustrations by Harrison Cady.

In the first book the queen of the fairies, Queen Silver-Bell, loses her "temper" (which most people do not know is really a fairy) and becomes known from then on as Queen Crosspatch. She knows that she will never find her temper again until she has done something that would make people–-particularly children–-believe in fairies as they used to "once upon a time," so she decides to get a "respectable" person to write the stories down as she tells them. The subsequent stories in the series all have the subtitle "As Told By Queen Crosspatch."

The first book, Queen Silver-Bell, also contains the story "How Winnie Hatched The Little Rooks."

Books in the series 
Queen Silver-Bell (November, 1906)
Racketty-Packetty House (1906)
The Cozy Lion (October, 1907)
The Spring Cleaning (October, 1908)

References

External links 
 

1906 American novels
1906 children's books
American children's books
Children's fantasy novels
Novels by Frances Hodgson Burnett